Hypselodoris saintvincentia is a species of colourful sea slug or dorid nudibranch, a marine gastropod mollusk in the family Chromodorididae.

Distribution
This species was described from the intertidal zone at Coobowie, west coast of St Vincent Gulf, South Australia . It is related to the widespread tropical species Hypselodoris infucata and the similar Australian species Hypselodoris obscura. It has been reported from depths to 12 m and from Western Australia.

References

Chromodorididae
Gastropods described in 1962